SG Heidelberg-Kirchheim is a German association football club from the Kirchheim district of the city of Heidelberg, Baden-Württemberg. The club's greatest success has been promotion to the Oberliga Baden-Württemberg on three occasions, in 1984, 1996 and 1998. It last played at this level in the 2000–01 season.

The club has also qualified for the DFB-Pokal, the German Cup, on two occasions courtesy to North Baden Cup wins.

History
SG Heidelberg-Kirchheim was formed in 1945 but the roots of some of its department date back earlier. The gymnastic department dates back to 1879, when the TV 1879 Kirchheim was formed while the footballers originated in the Fußballgesellschaft, formed in 1910.

The club first reached the highest level of play in North Baden when it earned promotion to the tier three Amateurliga Nordbaden in 1952. After a fourth-place finish in its first season there it came sixteenth the year after and was relegated again. The club returned to this league in 1957 and played as a mid-table side until 1963, when it was once more relegated. It made an immediate return in 1964 but came last in the league in 1967 and dropped down again and did not return to this level until the league was disbanded in 1978.

SG Heidelberg-Kirchheim was not part of either the new Oberliga Baden-Württemberg or the Verbandsliga Baden below it when those leagues were formed in 1978 but gained promotion to the latter in 1980. It finished runners-up in its first season there but failed to win promotion. In 1984 it won the league and moved up to the Oberliga for the first time. In a five-season stint in the Oberliga Baden-Württemberg from 1984 to 1989 a seventh place in 1985–86 was the club's best result. After relegation back to the Verbandsliga the club remained a top side in this league, finishing runners-up on three occasions between 1996. During this era North Baden Cup wins in 1988 and 1992 qualified the SG Heidelberg-Kirchheim for the DFB-Pokal twice. In 1988–89 it lost 1–3 to Waldhof Mannheim and in 1992–93 it received a bye for the first round and lost 3–0 in the second to Hertha BSC II, a team that would go on to reach the cup final that season.

A runners-up finish in 1996 and success in the promotion round took the club back up to the Oberliga for a season before suffering relegation again. It returned after a league championship in 1998 and played three seasons there until 2001. In this era falls the club's greatest success in the Oberliga Baden-Württemberg when it finished third in 1999–2000. After returning to the Verbandsliga in 2001 he club entered a weaker era in this league, playing the next nine seasons as a mid-table side until relegation in 2010 forced it to drop to the Landesliga Rhein-Neckar. SG Heidelberg-Kirchheim recovered and returned to the Verbandsliga after two seasons in 2012 where it plays today.

Honours
The club's honours:

League
 Verbandsliga Baden
 Champions: 1984, 1998
 Runners-up: 1981, 1991, 1992, 1996

Cup
 North Baden Cup
 Winners: 1988, 1992
 Runners-up: 2005

Recent seasons
The recent season-by-season performance of the club:

 With the introduction of the Regionalligas in 1994 and the 3. Liga in 2008 as the new third tier, below the 2. Bundesliga, all leagues below dropped one tier.

References

External links
Official club site
Official site of the football department
SG Heidelberg-Kirchheim at Weltfussball.de

Football clubs in Germany
Football clubs in Baden-Württemberg
Association football clubs established in 1945
1945 establishments in Germany
Sg